Eczacıbaşı Holding is a Turkish industrial group of companies founded in 1942. The group with 44 companies has 11,400 employees and a combined net turnover of TL 11.1 billion in 2020.

Group
Eczacıbaşı's core sectors are building products, pharmaceuticals and consumer products. Additionally, the group is active in finance, information technology, welding technology and real estate. Eczacıbaşı has distribution networks for pharmaceuticals, building products and fast-moving consumer goods. Internationally, Eczacıbaşı is known for its flagship VitrA brand, a contender in global bathroom and tile markets. It is also an exporter of tissue paper, pharmaceuticals, welding electrodes, electronic smart cards and industrial raw materials such as clay and feldspar.

International partnership is a central component of the Eczacıbaşı Group's growth strategy. Eczacıbaşı has four international joint ventures and numerous cooperation agreements with international companies.

Founder
Dr. Nejat Eczacıbaşı (1913–1993), the founder of the Eczacıbaşı Group, used to say that "the real measure of private entrepreneurship is the success with which it increases the wealth of the community as a whole".
 
Süleyman Ferit Eczacıbaşı was the first university-educated pharmacist in the city of Izmir and had a long career of public service during the early years of the Turkish Republic. He later on, was appointed "chief pharmacist" (Turkish: baş eczacı.) With the introduction of the Surname Law in 1934, Süleyman Ferit adopted his title "Eczacıbaşı" as family name.

Companies
 Building Products
 Brands: Burgbad, VitrA, Artema, İntema, V&B Fliesen GmbH (former tile division of Villeroy & Boch)
 Consumer Products
Brands: Unibaby, OK, Pia, Şelale, Selpak Professional
İpek Kağıt Tissue Paper subsidiary with headquarters in Istanbul. It was established in 1969 to manufacture bathroom tissue and promote its use in Turkey at a time when such products were considered luxury. They are Turkey's leading producer of toilet paper. Its three main plants are located in Altınova, close to Istanbul and Izmit. A fourth new plant was built in Manisa not far from Izmir. Ipek Kagit also run a converting factory in Kasachstan.
 Brands: Selpak, Solo, Silen, Servis
 Healthcare 
Eczacıbaşı Pharmaceuticals Marketing 
Eczacıbaşı Monrol Nuclear Products 
Eczacıbaşı Health Services
Eczacıbaşı Health Care (Russia)
Other Products and Services
 Eczacıbaşı Investment Holding
 Eczacıbaşı Pharmaceutical and Industrial Investment
E-Kart Electronic Card Systems 
Eczacıbaşı Information and Communication Technologies 
Esan 
Esan Italia Minerals
Kanyon Management and Marketing 
Ekom Eczacıbaşı Foreign Trade
Eczacıbaşı Property Development and Investments
Eczacıbaşı Insurance Agency

Corporate social responsibility

Education 

 Hygiene Project for Primary Boarding Schools is a project that aims to secure healthy environments for children at Primary Boarding Schools. 
 Spearheaded by three brands, VitrA, Artema and Selpak, this social responsibility project is renovating the bathrooms and showers of Regional Primary Boarding School dormitories and school buildings with VitrA and Artema products. Within the Eczacıbaşı Group, companies and employees that are contributing to the success of the project include Eczacıbaşı Building Products, İpek Kağıt Tissue Paper, Eczacıbaşı Girişim Marketing, and Eczacıbaşı Volunteers. Partnering the project is the Ministry of Education, which is determining the neediest schools and ensuring they have the required plumbing infrastructure.
 In the cooperation protocol that the Eczacıbaşı Group signed with the Turkish Ministry of Education in January 2010, 30 Regional Primary Boarding Schools will benefit from the project.
 Selpak is organizing personal hygiene classes at primary schools all around Turkey. To date, 6 million students at 8002 primary schools in 60 cities have benefited from this program since 2002.
 The Eczacıbaşı Hygiene Project was the recipient of the International Public Relations Association's 2009 Golden World Award in Social Responsibility and an Honorable Mention in the associated Special United Nations’ Award competition. It also received two Honorable Mentions from the US, one in the “Best Social Responsibility Project of Europe” category of the 2009 Stevie International Business Awards and the other in the “Community Relations” category of the PR News Platinum Awards.
 The Turkish Foundation of Education Volunteers (TEGV)
 The Eczacıbaşı Group contributes to this NGO through direct budgeting or special fund-raising events, like the 2002 auction of ceramic statues created by the VitrA Ceramic Art Studio.
 Dr. Nejat F. Eczacıbaşı Foundation Music Scholarships
 These scholarships enable outstanding young Turkish musicians to pursue graduate musical studies abroad. To date, the Foundation has provided financial support to 85 musicians studying instruments as well as orchestration, direction and composition.
 Primary School Sponsorship
 The Eczacıbaşı Group has built four primary schools for the Turkish public school system to which it provides annual funding. Around 4200 students attend these schools.
 Eczacıbaşı Sports School
 The Eczacıbaşı Sports School teaches volleyball to young girls in the 6-14 age group.
 Reproductive Health Hotline
 In 2000, Eczacıbaşı Pharmaceuticals Marketing established a free, 24-hour reproductive health hotline (ALO-OKEY) with the Family Planning Association of Turkey. The aim of the hotline is to enhance public access to information about reproductive health.

Sports
Established in 1966, the Eczacıbaşı Sports Club trained many of Turkey's best sportsmen and women in the fields of basketball, volleyball, gymnastics and table tennis before focusing its resources exclusively on women's volleyball in the early 1990s. During this period, the Club won 13 National Championships in table tennis, eight National Championships in men's basketball, 12 National Championships in men's volleyball, and three National Championships in chess.

Since 1968, the women's volleyball team has won 27 National Championships, seven National Cups and played in eight European Cup Finals, winning the “European Cup Winner’s Cup” in 1999. In addition to its A-team, the Club has three junior teams that have contributed players over the years to the A team, other first division teams and the Turkish National Volleyball Team.

Arts and Culture

 Istanbul Museum of Modern Art
 Istanbul Modern is a museum committed to preserving and exhibiting Turkey's heritage of modern and contemporary art.
 Eczacıbaşı Group is the founder of Turkey's first privately funded museum of modern art, to which it provided the initial investment and project management finance as well as the core collection of paintings.
 Using a combined chronological and thematic exhibition design of its permanent collection, İstanbul Modern showcases Turkish art through their foremost exponents. Additionally, the Museum organizes retrospective exhibitions of Turkish modern masters and of internationally acclaimed artists. İstanbul Modern also organizes periodic exhibitions of photography, video and modern Turkish sculpture in addition to thematic film programs.
 To date, more than 400 thousand students have participated in the educational programs organized by İstanbul Modern's Educational and Social Projects Department in the Museum and around the city. Overall, almost two million people have visited the Museum's exhibitions during its first two-and-a-half years of activities.
 Eczacıbaşı Virtual Museum 
 The Eczacıbaşı Group is committed to raising public awareness and appreciation of Turkish modern art. To this end, it has developed one of the largest permanent collections of abstract and figurative work by Turkish painters.
 In 1999, to increase public access to this collection and other paintings, the Group established a virtual museum of Turkish visual art. In line with contemporary museum norms, the Eczacıbaşı Virtual Museum contains both permanent and temporary collections supplemented by curatorial text.
 Istanbul International Music, Film, Jazz, Theatre and Visual Art Festivals 
 The Eczacıbaşı Group is a supporter of the Istanbul International Festivals, both through its sponsorship of the Istanbul Foundation for Culture and the Arts, founded in 1973 on the initiative of Dr. Nejat F. Eczacıbaşı, and its direct patronage of festivals. In particular, the Eczacıbaşı Group's support of the Istanbul International Music Festival has contributed to its international prestige. Starting in 2006, Eczacıbaşı has become the leading sponsor of the İstanbul Foundation for Culture and Arts. In its new role, Eczacıbaşı Holding will contribute to the International Istanbul Film, Theatre and Jazz Festivals as well as the Music Festival, enhancing its involvement in the Foundation and broadening its communication with art lovers.
 VitrA Ceramic Arts Studio
 Dr. Nejat F. Eczacıbaşı established the VitrA Ceramic Art Studio in 1957, with the goal of encouraging ceramic artists and public appreciation of this medium. Over the years, the VitrA Ceramic Arts Studio has opened its doors to talented ceramic artists, organized public exhibitions of their work and hosted master classes, conferences, slide shows and workshops on ceramic art. The VitrA Ceramic Arts Studio is a member of the Geneva-based International Academy of Ceramics (IAC).
 Eczacıbaşı Arts Encyclopedia
 Published in 1997 by the Dr. Nejat F. Eczacıbaşı Foundation, the Eczacıbaşı Arts Encyclopedia is a three-volume work on international art and architecture that begins with pre-historic Anatolian cultures and focuses especially on the Byzantine, Seljuk, Beylik, Ottoman and Republican periods in Turkey. About 250 researchers, writers and university faculty worked on the project, which contains 4,400 articles.

Public policy and scientific research
Eczacıbaşı Scientific Research and Medical Award Fund 
The Eczacıbaşı Group established this fund in 1959 to promote high caliber medical research. The fund has supported 171 medical research projects and presented 65 awards to Turkish scientists for research in health and medicine. Since 2002, the Scientific Research and Medical Award Fund is also supporting research carried out by medical students.

The Eczacıbaşı Scientific Research and Medical Award Funds are presented every two years at Eczacıbaşı Medical Day. This biannual event organized by the Eczacıbaşı Group aims to provide a forum for scientists and health professionals in Turkey to discuss medical topics and developments in the health sector and to recognize the medical and health-related research of their colleagues.

Turkish Economic and Social Studies Foundation (TESEV)
Eczacıbaşı is a supporter of the Turkish Economic and Social Studies Foundation, an independent, non-profit think-tank dedicated to conducting and supporting research on public policy issues. TESEV is the successor of the Economic and Social Studies Conference Board, which Dr. Nejat Eczacıbaşı founded in 1961. Every year, the Eczacıbaşı Group sponsors a competition organized by TESEV to promote public policy-oriented research and encourage young researchers in this field.

Turkish Informatics Foundation
The Eczacıbaşı Group is a corporate sponsor of the Turkish Informatics Foundation, established in 1995 through the efforts of the Group's vice-chairman, Faruk Eczacıbaşı, also the foundation's current chairman. The foundation's main goal is to contribute to the development of the legal, technical and physical infrastructure required for Turkey's transition to an information-based society.

See also
List of companies of Turkey
Eczacıbaşı Sports Club

References

External links
 The Eczacıbaşı Group
 Industrie Ceramiche - Vitra
 Kanyon Levent
 İstanbul Modern

Conglomerate companies established in 1942
Companies based in Istanbul
Conglomerate companies of Turkey
Eczacıbaşı family
Holding companies of Turkey
Turkish companies established in 1942